Michael Cary Woodard (born March 2, 1960 in Melrose Park, Illinois) is an American former professional baseball player. He played all or part of four seasons in Major League Baseball (MLB), from 1985 through 1988, for the San Francisco Giants (1985–87) and Chicago White Sox (1988), primarily as a second baseman. He batted left-handed and threw right-handed.

In his major league career, Woodard had a batting average of .222, going 50-for-225, with one home run and 19 RBIs in 100 games, including 29 runs, four doubles, two triples, and 14 stolen bases.

References

External links

1960 births
Living people
African-American baseball players
Albany-Colonie A's players
American expatriate baseball players in Canada
Baseball players from Illinois
Bend Timber Hawks players
Chicago White Sox players
Colorado Springs Sky Sox players
Columbus Clippers players
Major League Baseball second basemen
Modesto A's players
People from Melrose Park, Illinois
Phoenix Firebirds players
San Francisco Giants players
Tacoma Tigers players
Tucson Toros players
Vancouver Canadians players
West Haven A's players
West Haven Whitecaps players
21st-century African-American people
20th-century African-American sportspeople